Bati is a Southern Bantoid language of Cameroon.

References

External links 

 ELAR Archive deposit of A documentation of Bati language and oral traditions, deposited by Emmanuel Ngue Um

Mbam languages
Languages of Cameroon